Chalita (from ) is a Thai feminine given name that may refer to
Chalita Suansane (born 1994), Thai model and beauty pageant titleholder 
Chalita Yaemwannang (born 1988), Thai model and beauty pageant titleholder 

Thai feminine given names